Foa fo is a species of cardinalfish of the genus Foa. Its common names include Samoan Cardinalfish, Weedy cardinalfish, and Samoan Fo.

See also
 List of short species names

References

Apogoninae
Fish described in 1905
Taxa named by David Starr Jordan
Taxa named by Alvin Seale